Town was named after Frank H. Payne, May 15, 1866- July 26, 1949.  He was the Justice of the Peace, was a PVT Co D 1 BN NEV INF in the Spanish–American War.  Married Hazel ( Phillips) -Payne, a native Washo Indian- made residence and raised 4 children

Paynesville is an unincorporated community in Alpine County, California. It is located on the Carson River a quarter mile (0.4 km) northeast of Woodfords, at an elevation of 5118 feet (1560 m).

References

External links

Unincorporated communities in California
Unincorporated communities in Alpine County, California